Almeria Walk of Fame (Paseo de la fama de Almería in Spanish) is the filmmaking Walk of Fame located in Almeria, Spain, similar to Hollywood Walk of Fame.

Celebrities 

The celebrities who have their own star are:

 Eduardo Fajardo received his star on April 11, 2012 for his role in 7th Cavalry and Django.
 Omar Sharif received his star on December 4, 2012 for his role in Lawrence of Arabia
 Ridley Scott received his a star for directing Exodus: Gods and Kings. in 2013
 Producer Denis O'Dell received his star on December 3, 2013 for his work on How I Won the War.
 Max von Sydow received his star on December 5, 2013 for his role in March or Die.
 Arnold Schwarzenegger received his star on October 29, 2014 for his role in Conan the Barbarian, as well as receiving Almería Tierra de Cine prix.
 Actor and director Terry Gilliam received his star on December 3, 2014 during the XIII Festival Internacional de Cortometrajes Almería en Corto.
 Patrick Wayne received his star on December 1, 2015 for his role in The Deserter, Sinbad and the Eye of the Tiger and Rustlers' Rhapsody.
 Ángela Molina received her star on December 6, 2015 for her role in Las cosas del querer, L'homme qui a perdu son ombre and One of the Hollywood Ten.
 Catherine Deneuve received her star on November 13, 2016 for her role in March or Die.
 Spanish actor José Coronado, received a star on November 19, 2016, as well as the Almería Tierra de Cine prix.
 American actor Aaron Paul has shown affection for the city, and he has confirmed he would receive a star for his role in Exodus: Gods and Kings in 2014 when he came back to promote the film.
 Ayuntamiento de Almería is working in order to Clint Eastwood received this honour when he came back to the city.
 Brian De Palma received a star for directing the film Domino.
 Danish actor Nikolaj Coster-Waldau received a star for his role in De Palma's film.
 Italian actress Sophia Loren received a star on 16 November 2017 for her role in Bianco, rosso e.... She also received the Almería Tierra de Cine award.
 Spanish director Álex de la Iglesia received a star on 17 November 2017.
 Blake Lively received the star for the film The Rhythm Section (2019) July 2018.
 Luis Tosar received the star for the films El Niño (2014) and Toro'' (2016) on 17 November 2018.
 On 21 November 2018 Alison Doody received a star.
 On 24 November 2018 Bo Derek received the star and also the Almería tierra de cine award.
 On 16 November 2019 Jorge Sanz received the star for his long career.

See also 
 List of halls and walks of fame

References 

2012 establishments in Spain
Walks of fame
Almería
Entertainment halls of fame